Azrael's Tear is a 1996 first-person adventure game published by Mindscape and developed by Intelligent Games.

Plot
Taking place in 2012, the player assumes the role of a futuristic grave robber/archaeologist called a "raptor", who has come to explore a recently opened cavern in Scotland rumoured to contain the Holy Grail.

Development
Ken Haywood produced the original concept for the game and worked with Intelligent Games's own Richard Guy on the final design. The original design called for a Myst-style pre-rendered environment. As development progressed, the team switched to real-time 3D. The game features music written by Ray Shulman and Kerry Minnear, both former members of Gentle Giant.

Reception

Both GameSpot and Next Generation commented that the control interface is highly counterintuitive, especially the inverted cursor movement, and cannot be changed. GameSpot reviewer Tal Blevins opined that the game is otherwise well-worth playing, citing the atmospheric music, entertaining story, and good integration of the puzzles into the plot. He was particularly pleased with the graphic design, remarking that "the game is steeped in shadow that hides a subtle richness; it may take several game sessions for you to truly appreciate the brilliant artistic design included." The Next Generation reviewer agreed that the story is gripping but was somewhat less impressed, summarizing, "Azrael's Tear brings adventure, high-resolution graphics, and a smattering of action to what is essentially a Myst clone, adding a little life - just a little - to a genre that sorely needs it." Nicholas Petreley of InfoWorld wrote, "Azrael's Tear is not a crowd-pleaser, and I'm grateful for it. It is for those people who like to lose themselves in an entirely different world. If you're among that camp, prepare to enter the world of Azrael's Tear and rarely come up for air."

Andy Butcher reviewed Azrael's Tear for Arcane magazine, rating it a 7 out of 10 overall. Butcher comments that "If you take the time to get into it [...] Azrael's Tear is atmospheric and extremely satisfying."

In a 2002 retrospective review for Just Adventure, Michael Necasek commented, "The story of Azrael's Tear revolves around props far from unusual in adventure games: the Holy Grail, the Knights Templar, secret conspiracies to rule the world. These all are almost clichés. But like other good games (Gabriel Knight 3 comes to mind), Azrael's Tear manages to explain them with unexpected twists."

Azrael's Tear was not a commercial success. However, project leader Matthew Stibbe said in a presentation on the history of games that it is the only game he produced that got fan  mail.

References

External links

1996 video games
Adventure games
DOS games
DOS-only games
Video games developed in the United Kingdom
Video games set in Scotland
First-person adventure games
Mindscape games